Patrick Robinson (born 21 January 1940) is a British novelist and newspaper columnist living in Cotuit, Massachusetts, US. He is the father of Ben Robinson from the Bravo TV shows Below Deck and Below Deck Mediterranean.

His recent books are naval-based thrillers, each telling the story of a crisis facing the world in the early 21st century. His earlier works include four nonfiction books about thoroughbred horses; True Blue: The Oxford Boat Race Mutiny, the story of the 1987 Oxford Boat Race mutiny (for which he, and co-author Dan Topolski won the inaugural William Hill Sports Book of the Year in 1989); and One Hundred Days, the biography of Admiral Sir Sandy Woodward.

Bibliography

Fiction
Stand-alone Novels
 Slider (2002)
Admiral Arnold Morgan
 Nimitz Class (1997)
 Kilo Class (1998)
 H.M.S. Unseen (1999)
 U.S.S. Seawolf (2000)
 The Shark Mutiny (2001)
 Barracuda 945 (2003)
 Scimitar SL-2 (2004)
 Hunter Killer (2005)
 Ghost Force (2006)
 To the Death (2008)

Navy Seal Lt. Commander Mack Bedford
 Diamondhead (2009)
 Intercept (2010)
 The Delta Solution (2011)
 Power Play (2012)

Non-fiction
 Classic Lines
 The Golden Post
 Decade of Champions
 Born to Win (John Bertrand and Patrick Robinson) (1985)
 True Blue: The Oxford Boat Race Mutiny (Daniel Topolski with Patrick Robinson) (1989)
 One Hundred Days (Sandy Woodward and Patrick Robinson) (1992)
 Horsetrader (with Nick Robinson) (1993)
 Lone Survivor: The Eyewitness Account of Operation Redwing and the Lost Heroes of SEAL Team 10 – Marcus Luttrell with Patrick Robinson (2007)
 A Colossal Failure of Common Sense: The Inside Story of the Collapse of Lehman Brothers – Lawrence G. McDonald with Patrick Robinson (2009)
 Topgun on Wall Street (Jeffery Lay with Patrick Robinson) (2013)
 Honor and Betrayal (2013)
 The Lion of Sabray (2015)

References

External links
 Patrick Robinson's Speaking Page

1940 births
20th-century British novelists
21st-century British novelists
Living people
British male novelists
People from Cotuit, Massachusetts
20th-century British male writers
21st-century British male writers
British expatriates in the United States